The John Sanford Saltus Medal is the premier distinction of the British Numismatic Society, awarded triennially, on the vote of Members, for the recipient's scholarly contributions to British Numismatics. The medal was established in 1910 with a generous donation by Mr John Sanford Saltus (1854-1922), a past-President of the Society. 

Although the award was initially based on publications in the British Numismatic Journal, the regulations were widened in 2005 to take account of an author's entire publications in the field and to make non-members eligible for the award. An appeal in 2005 established a Prize Fund to support this and the Society's other prizes.

Recipients of the Medal

1910: P. W. P. Carlyon-Britton
1911: Helen Farquhar
1914: W. J. Andrew
1917: L. A. Lawrence
1920: Lt Col. H. W. Morrieson
1923: H. A. Parsons
1926: G. R. Francis
1929: J. S. Shirley-Fox
1932: C. Winter
1935: R. Carlyon-Britton
1938: W. C. Wells
1941: C. A. Whitton
1944: (Not awarded)
1947: R. C. Lockett
1950: C. E. Blunt
1953: D. F. Allen
1956: F. Elmore Jones
1959: R. H. M. Dolley
1962: H. H. King
1965: H. Schneider
1968: E. J. Winstanley
1968: C. W. Peck (posthumous award)
1971: B. H. I. H. Stewart
1974: C. S. S. Lyon
1977: S. E. Rigold
1980: Marion M. Archibald
1983: D. M. Metcalf
1986: Joan E. L. Murray
1989: H. E. Pagan
1992: C. E. Challis
1995: J. J. North
1997: P. Grierson (special award)
1999: R. H. Thompson
2002: E. M. Besly
2005: P. Woodhead
2008: M. A. S. Blackburn
2011: M. R. Allen

References
The Sanford Saltus Medal on the British Numismatic Society website

Awards for numismatics